Marcelo Altamirano (born 31 January 1985) is a Chilean footballer.

He played for Deportes Concepción.

References

External links
 

1985 births
Living people
Chilean footballers
Deportes La Serena footballers
Deportes Concepción (Chile) footballers
O'Higgins F.C. footballers
Chilean Primera División players
Primera B de Chile players
Sportspeople from Concepción, Chile
Association football goalkeepers
21st-century Chilean people